The Battle of Idomene was a battle in the Peloponnesian War in 426 BC, between the Athenians and the Ambracians. 

The Ambracians, who were allies of the Spartans, had sent a relief force to help the army that had invaded Amphilochia previously. Unbeknownst to the Ambracians, the first army had been defeated, surrounded and scattered by the allied Athenians, Amphilochians and Acarnanians the day before. The Ambracians, unaware of the incoming Athenian army, camped on the lower of two steep hills. Demosthenes, the Athenian commander, occupied the higher hill, obtaining a strategic advantage. Before dawn, while the Ambracians were still asleep, they were attacked and destroyed by the Athenians. 

Overall, the Ambraciots lost about 1,000 men over the two battles. Thucydides describes this disaster as: "The greatest disaster to strike a single city in an equal number of days in this war."

References
Kagan, Donald. The Peloponnesian War. Penguin Books, 2003. 

Idomene
426 BC
420s BC conflicts
Idomene
Ancient Acarnania